Deer Run may refer to:

 Deer Run, Calgary, Canada
 Deer Run (Tohickon Creek), a tributary of the Tohickon Creek in Bedminster Township, Bucks County, Pennsylvania, United States
 Deer Run, West Virginia, United States
 Deer Squad, a Chinese TV series formerly titled Deer Run